Armando dos Santos may refer to:
Armando dos Santos (bobsleigh), Brazilian bobsleigh competitor
Armandinho (footballer) (Armando dos Santos, 1911–1972), association football player for Brazil